is a Japanese professional baseball Pitcher for the Fukuoka SoftBank Hawks of Nippon Professional Baseball.

Early baseball career
Tsumori went on to Tohoku Fukushi University, and he pitched as a relief pitcher in the 67th Japan National Collegiate Baseball Championship and won the Most valuable player Award.

Professional career
On October 17, 2019, Tsumori was drafted by the Fukuoka SoftBank Hawks in the 2019 Nippon Professional Baseball draft.

On June 21, 2020, Tsumori debuted in the Pacific League against the Chiba Lotte Marines as a relief pitcher in a bases-loaded, no-out situation and was hit by a Grand slam. In the match against the Saitama Seibu Lions on June 24, he pitched as a relief pitcher and became his first Winning pitcher. In 2020 season, he recorded with a 14 Games pitched, a 1–0 Win–loss record, a 2.76 ERA, a 3 Holds, a 17 strikeouts in 16.1 innings. In the 2020 Japan Series against the Yomiuri Giants, he was selected as the Japan Series roster.

On July 17, 2021, Tsumori participated the All-Star Game for the first time in My Navi All-Star Game 2021. In 2021 season, he recorded with a 45 Games pitched, a 1–0 Win–loss record, a 2.18 ERA, a 11 Holds, and a 43 strikeouts in 33 innings.

In 2022 season, he finished the regular season with a 51 Games pitched, a 4–6 Win–loss record, a 2.91 ERA, a 18 Holds, one saves, and a 51 strikeouts in 46.1 innings.

International career
Tsumori was elected to the Japan national baseball team at the 2018 Haarlem Baseball Week,　and was elected to the Japan national baseball team at the 2017  USA VS Japan Collegiate All-Star Series and the 2018  USA VS Japan Collegiate All-Star Series.

References

External links

 statistics - NPB.jp
 11 Yuki Tsumori PLAYERS2022 - Fukuoka SoftBank Hawks Official site

1998 births
Living people
Fukuoka SoftBank Hawks players
Japanese baseball players
Nippon Professional Baseball pitchers
Baseball people from Wakayama Prefecture